Plata Passage or Admiral Merino Channel is a passage in Wilhelmina Bay separating Brooklyn Island from the west coast of Graham Land. First charted by the Belgian Antarctic Expedition under Gerlache, 1897–99, and named after the estuary between Argentina and Uruguay in recognition of the services rendered the expedition by the people of Argentina.

References 

Straits of Graham Land
Danco Coast